Anumanaspadam is a 2007 Telugu mystery thriller film directed by Vamsy. Aryan Rajesh and Hamsa Nandini play the lead roles. while Tanikella Bharani and Jaya Prakash Reddy play supporting roles. The music was composed by Ilaiyaraaja, with cinematography by P. G. Vinda. The film released on 10 February 2007.

Plot
After hardcore smuggler Dheerappan was killed in a shootout by police, a reporter named Bhavaraju Suryanarayana, alias Bhasu happened to watch a video cassette recorded by a dead smuggler. From the video, he learns about a secret treasure trove buried in a forest. Bhasu plans to grab the treasure, so he forms a team of a few people. They make a move towards the forests in a hired vehicle and enter the same. Having risked their lives, the treasure hunters swoop in on the trove. All of a sudden, the team members get killed one after the other. By the time the survivors come to know what is happening, they are nearly finished. Who the killer is forms the main suspense.

Cast
 Aryan Rajesh as Bhavaraju Suryanarayana / Bhasu
 Hamsa Nandini as Devika
 Tanikella Bharani as Forest Officer
 Jaya Prakash Reddy as Thangavelu
 Vanitha Reddy as Kamini
 Chittajalu Lakshmipati
 M. S. Narayana as Bhasu's boss (cameo)

Soundtrack

The music and background score was composed by Ilaiyaraaja.

Reception
Rediff said that, "Anumanaspadam is worth a watch."

References

External links

2007 films
2007 thriller films
2000s Telugu-language films
Films scored by Ilaiyaraaja
Films directed by Vamsy